The Gaharu Tea Valley is an agro-tourism tea plantation in Gopeng, Kampar District, Perak, Malaysia.

History
The tea valley started to welcome visitors since 2012.

Geography
The plantation has over 200,000 trees of a special hybrid Aquilaria spp species which is critically endangered in the wild which spreads over an area of 120 hectares. Gaharu is the local Malay name for this tree better known as Agarwood, Aloes or Eagleswood to the world.

See also
 List of tourist attractions in Perak
 Agriculture in Malaysia

References

External links
 Facebook Page - Gaharu Tea Valley Gopeng (務邊沉香山茶園)

Geography of Perak
2012 establishments in Malaysia